Jason Maurice Anderson (born April 29, 1980 in Palmdale, California) is a former professional American football running back in the National Football League. He was with the Houston Texans for 2 seasons (2004–2005) but only saw action in 1 game in 2005.

External links
Pro-Football-Reference

1980 births
Living people
People from Palmdale, California
American football running backs
South Dakota Coyotes football players
Sportspeople from Los Angeles County, California
Houston Texans players
Amsterdam Admirals players
Players of American football from California